The 1990 PSA Men's World Open Squash Championship is the men's edition of the 1990 World Open, which serves as the individual world championship for squash players. The event took place in Toulouse in France from 4 November to 11 November 1990. Jansher Khan won his third World Open title, defeating Chris Dittmar in the final.

Seeds

Notes
Jahangir Khan the world number one and top seed withdrew from the tournament due to injury and illness.

Draw and results

See also
PSA World Open
1990 Women's World Open Squash Championship

References

External links
World Squash History

M
World Squash Championships
M
International sports competitions hosted by France
Squash tournaments in France
1990 in French sport